was a district located in Ishikawa Prefecture, Japan.

As of February 2011, the district had an estimated population of 51,976 and a density of 3,830 persons per squire kilometer. The total area was 13.56 km2.

Towns and villages
Prior to its dissolution, the district had one town:

 Nonoichi

History

Recent mergers
 On February 1, 2005 - The towns of Mikawa and Tsurugi, and the villages of Kawachi, Oguchi, Shiramine, Torigoe and Yoshinodani were merged with the city of Mattō to create the city of Hakusan.
 On November 11, 2011 - The remaining town of Nonoichi was elevated to city status. Therefore, Ishikawa District was dissolved as a result of this merger.

See also
 List of dissolved districts of Japan

References

Former districts of Ishikawa Prefecture